The Prix du Quai des Orfèvres is an annual French literature award created in 1946 by Jacques Catineau. It goes to an unpublished manuscript for a French-language police novel. The selected novel is then published by a major French publishing house, since 1965 Fayard. The jury is led by the chief of the Prefecture of Police of Paris. The name of the award refers to the headquarters of the Paris police, located at 36, quai des Orfèvres.

Laureates
The following writers have received the award:
 1946: Jacques Levert, for Le Singe rouge
 1947: Jean Le Hallier, for Un certain monsieur...
 1948: Yves Fougères, for Nuit et brouillard
 1949: Francis Didelot, for L'Assassin au clair de lune
 1951: Maurice Debroka, for Opération Magali
 1952: Saint Gilles, for Ne tirez pas sur l'inspecteur
 1953: Cécil Saint-Laurent, for Sophie et le crime
 1954: Alain Serdac & Jean Maurinay, for Sans effusion de sang
 1956: Noël Calef, for Échec au porteur
 1957: Louis C. Thomas, for Poison d'Avril
 1958: André Gillois, for 125, rue Montmartre
 1959: Jean Marcillac, for On ne tue pas pour s'amuser
 1960: Rémy, for Le Monocle noir
 1961: Robert Thomas, for Huit femmes
 1962: Micheline Sandrel, for Dix millions de témoins
 1963: Roland Pidoux, for On y va, patron?
 1964: Jean-François Vignat, for Vertige en eau profonde
 1965: Paul Drieux, for Archives interdites
 1966: Julien Clay, for Du sang sur le grand livre
 1967: H.L. Dugall, for La Porte d'or
 1968: Bernard-Paul Lallier, for Le Saut de l'ange
 1969: Christian Charrière, for Dites-le avec des fleurs
1970: Henry Chardot, for le Crime du vendredi saint
1971: André Friederich, for Un mur de 500 briques
1972: Pierre-Martin Perreaut, for Trop, c'est trop!
1974: Michèle Ressi, for La Mort du bois de Saint-Ixe
1975: Bernard Matignon, for Une mort qui fait du bruit
1976: Serge Montigny, for Une fleur pour mourir
1977: Jacquemard-Sénécal, for Le Crime de la maison Grün
1978: Pierre Magnan, for Le Sang des Atrides
1979: Julien Vartet, for Le Déjeuner interrompu
1980: Denis Lacombe, for Dans le creux de la main
1981: Michel Dansel, for De la part de Barbara
1982: Hélène Pasquier, for Coup double
1983: Maurice Périsset, for Périls en la demeure
1984: Jean Lamborelle, for On écrase bien les vipères
1985: Roger Labrusse, for Les Crimes du Bon Dieu
1986: Michel de Roy, for Sûreté urbaine
1987: Nicole Buffetaut, for Le Mystère des petits lavoirs
1988: Yves Fougères, for Un agent très secret
1989: Godefroy Hofer, for Plongée de nuit
1990: Suzanne Le Viguelloux, for La Mort au noir
1991: Frédéric Hoë, for Crimes en trompe-l'œil
1992: Louis-Marie Brézac, for Razzia sur l'antique
1993: Gérard Delteil, for Pièces détachées
1994: Jean-Louis Viot, for Une belle garce
1995: Michel Gastine, for Quai de la Rapée
1996: Gilbert Schlogel, for Rage de flic
1997: Roger Le Taillanter, for Heures d'angoisse
1998: Michel Sibra, for La Danse du soleil
1999: André Delabarre, for Du sang sur les roses
2000: André Arnaud, for Pierres de sang
2001: Guy Langlois, for Le Fond de l'âme effraie
2002: André Klopmann, for Crève l'écran
2003: Jérôme Jarrige, for Le Bandit n'était pas manchot
2004: Sylvie M. Jema, for Les Sarments d'Hippocrate
2005: Jules Grasset, for Les Violons du diable
2006: Christelle Maurin, for L'Ombre du soleil
2007: Frédérique Molay, for La 7e femme
2008: P.J. Lambert, for Le Vengeur des catacombes
2009: Christophe Guillaumot, for Chasses à l'homme
2010: Gilbert Gallerne, for Au pays des ombres
2011: Claude Ragon, for Du bois pour les cercueils
2012: Pierre Borromée, for L'hermine était pourpre
2013: Danielle Thiéry, for Des clous dans le cœur
2014: Hervé Jourdain, for Le Sang de la trahison
2015: Maryse Rivière, for Tromper la mort
2016: Lionel Olivier, for Le crime était signé
2017: Pierre Pouchairet, for Mortels Trafics
2018: Sylvain Forge, for Tension extrême
2019: Paul Merault, for Le Cercle des impunis
2020: Alexandre Galien, for Les Cicatrices de la nuit
2021: Christophe Gavat, for Cap Canaille

References

External links
 Official website 

Awards established in 1946
French literary awards
French-language literary awards
Mystery and detective fiction awards
1946 establishments in France